CoRoT-14b is a transiting exoplanet found by the CoRoT space telescope in 2010.

It is a hot Jupiter-sized planet orbiting a F9V star with Te = 6035K, M = 1.13M☉, R = 1.21R☉, and near-solar metallicity. It has an estimated age between 0.4 and 8.0 Gyr.

The planet is unusually dense (7.3 g/cm3) for its mass and distance from host star, making COROT-14b one of the most dense gas giants known.

References

See also
WASP-18b
COROT-20b

Hot Jupiters
Transiting exoplanets
Exoplanets discovered in 2010
14b